Zaytsy is a rural locality (a village) in Vereshchaginskoye Urban Settlement, Vereshchaginsky District, Perm Krai, Russia. The population was 56 as of 2010.

Geography 
Zaytsy is located 5 km south of Vereshchagino (the district's administrative centre) by road. Borshchovtsy is the nearest rural locality.

References 

Rural localities in Vereshchaginsky District